Standing NATO Mine Countermeasures Group 2 (SNMCMG2) is a North Atlantic Treaty Organization (NATO) standing mine countermeasures Immediate Reaction Force. Its role is to provide NATO with an immediate operational response capability.

History
From its activation on 27 May 1999, the unit was initially called Standing Mine Countermeasures Force (in the) Mediterranean (MCMFORMED).

MCMFORMED and her sister force Mine Counter Measures Force North Western Europe (MCMFORNORTH) were tasked in June 1999 to operate in the Adriatic Sea to clear ordnance jettisoned during Operation Allied Force. The combined force comprised 11 minehunters and minesweepers and a support ship. The operation, named Allied Harvest, began on 9 June 1999. Search activities began three days later and lasted 73 days. In total, 93 pieces of ordnance were located and cleared in the nine areas which encompassed .

From 3 September 2001 it was known as the Mine Countermeasures Force South (MCMFORSOUTH) and from 1 January 2005 it became Standing NATO Mine Countermeasures Group 2.

Current ships
As of 15 January 2023, the fleet consists of:

  (Flagship) Logistics Assistance Ship, Yzb. Güngör Durmuş
  Gaeta class minehunter, Numana
  Engin class minehunter, Enez

See also
Standing NATO Maritime Group 1
Standing NATO Maritime Group 2
Standing NATO Mine Countermeasures Group 1

References

External links
 SNMCMG2 official web page

Military units and formations of NATO
Greece and NATO
Germany and NATO
Italy and NATO
Spain and NATO
Turkey and NATO